The 2021–22 SHL season was the 47th season of the Swedish Hockey League (SHL). The regular season began on 11 September 2021 and ended on 15 March 2022, it was then followed by the playoffs and the relegation playoffs. The league consisted of 14 teams; Timrå IK returned to the SHL after two seasons in HockeyAllsvenskan, having won the 2020–21 HockeyAllsvenskan.

Like the previous season, the COVID-19 pandemic in Sweden has resulted in many games being postponed, resulting in an uneven schedule.

Teams

Regular season
Each team will play 52 games, playing each of the other thirteen teams four times: twice on home ice, and twice away from home. Points will be awarded for each game, where three points will be awarded for winning in regulation time, two points for winning in overtime or shootout, one point for losing in overtime or shootout, and zero points for losing in regulation time. At the end of the regular season, the team that will finish with the most points will be crowned the league champion.

The four best teams of the regular season will qualify for the 2022–23 Champions Hockey League (if the play-off winners qualify through the regular season, its spot will go to the 5th placed team of the regular season; if a Swedish team wins 2021–22 Champions Hockey League, three best teams of the regular season will qualify, and, if the play-off winners qualify through the regular season, its spot will go to the 4th placed team of the regular season).

Standings

Statistics

Scoring leaders

The following shows the top ten players who led the league in points, at the conclusion of the regular season. If two or more skaters are tied (i.e. same number of points, goals and played games), all of the tied skaters are shown.

Leading goaltenders
The following shows the top ten goaltenders who led the league in goals against average, provided that they have played at least 40% of their team's minutes, at the conclusion of the regular season.

Playoffs
Ten teams qualify for the playoffs: the top six teams in the regular season have a bye to the quarterfinals, while teams ranked seventh to tenth meet each other (7 versus 10, 8 versus 9) in a preliminary playoff round.

Format
In the first round, the 7th-ranked team meets the 10th-ranked team and the 8th-ranked team meets the 9th-ranked team for a place in the second round. In the second round, the top-ranked team will meet the lowest-ranked winner of the first round, the second-ranked team will face the other winner of the first round, the third-ranked team will face the sixth-ranked team, and the fourth-ranked team will face the fifth-ranked team. In the third round, the highest remaining seed is matched against the lowest remaining seed. In each round the higher-seeded team is awarded home advantage. The meetings are in the first round played as best-of-three series, and in the later rounds as best-of-seven series. In the eighth-finals, the higher-seeded teams play at home for game 2 (plus 3 if necessary) while the lower-seeded teams play at home for game 1. In the later rounds, the higher-seeded teams are at home for games 1 and 2 (plus 5 and 7 if necessary) while the lower-seeded teams are at home for games 3 and 4 (plus 6 if necessary).

Playoff bracket

Eighth-finals

(7) Örebro HK vs. (10) Brynäs IF

(8) Leksands IF vs. (9) IK Oskarshamn

Quarter-finals

(1) Rögle BK vs. (9) IK Oskarshamn

(2) Luleå HF vs. (7) Örebro HK

(3) Skellefteå AIK vs. (6) Färjestad BK

(4) Frölunda HC vs. (5) Växjö Lakers

Semi-finals

(1) Rögle BK vs. (6) Färjestad BK

(2) Luleå HF vs. (4) Frölunda HC

Finals

(2) Luleå HF vs. (6) Färjestad BK

Statistics

Scoring leaders
The following players led the league in points, at the conclusion of the playoffs. If two or more skaters are tied (i.e. same number of points, goals and played games), all of the tied skaters are shown.

Leading goaltenders
The following shows the top five goaltenders who led the league in goals against average, provided that they have played at least 40% of their team's minutes, at the conclusion of the playoffs.

Play Out
Teams 13 and 14 from the regular season played a best-of-seven series, with the winner remaining in the SHL and the loser relegated to the second tier, HockeyAllsvenskan. The higher-seeded team held home advantage over the series, playing at home for the odd-numbered games while the lower-seeded team was at home for the even-numbered games.

SHL awards

References

External links

SHL on eurohockey.com
SHL on eliteprospects.com

2021-22
SHL
2021–22 in European ice hockey leagues